
Pelagia, distinguished as Pelagia of Antioch and Pelagia the Virgin, was a Christian saint, virgin, and martyr who leapt to her death during the Diocletianic Persecution rather than be forced by Roman soldiers to offer a public sacrifice to the pagan gods, or to do "something unspeakable (for she was a virgin)", typically inferred as the Roman soldiers attempting to rape her.  She was 15 years old. Originally, her feast day was celebrated on October 8, in common with SS Pelagia the Harlot and Pelagia of Tarsus. In the Roman Catholic Church, it came to be celebrated on June 9 and, at Naples in Italy, she is celebrated on October 5.

Life
Pelagia is mentioned by Ambrose and was the subject of two sermons by John Chrysostom. She was home alone during the Diocletian Persecution when Roman soldiers arrived. She came out to meet them and, discovering they intended to compel her to participate in a pagan sacrifice, she received permission to change her clothes. She went to the roof of her house and threw herself into the sea. The patristic sources treat this as a sacred martyrdom rather than an ignoble suicide.

Legacy
Pelagia's story was the probable basis for the later dubious accounts of Pelagia of Tarsus.

See also
 SS Marina the Monk & Margaret the Virgin, with whom she is also conflated

References

Citations

Bibliography
 .
 

3rd-century Christian saints
3rd-century Christian martyrs
Christians martyred during the reign of Diocletian
Suicides by jumping in Turkey